Mxolisi Lukhele (born 4 March 1991) is a Liswati footballer who plays for Royal Leopards F.C. in the Swazi Premier League.

International career

International goals
Scores and results list eSwatini's goal tally first.

References

External links
 

1991 births
Living people
Eswatini international footballers
Association football midfielders
Swazi footballers